Berrocalejo de Aragona is a municipality located in the province of Ávila, Castile and León, Spain. According to the 2004 census (INE), the municipality had a population of 52 inhabitants. The towns current economy is 80% Activity, 15% Constructive Activity, and 5% Establishments and Services The current Mayor is Emilio Navas Arroyo. The small town is now attempting to make its presence known by others using its new website and "virtual town hall".

References

External links 
 The town's homepage 

Municipalities in the Province of Ávila